Nicholas Van Campen Taylor (born August 1, 1972), known as Van Taylor, is an American businessman and Republican politician from Plano, Texas. He was the U.S. representative for Texas's 3rd congressional district from 2019 to 2023, and was first elected in 2018.

The district included much of Collin County, a suburban county north of Dallas. A veteran of the Iraq War, he represented the 8th district in the Texas Senate from 2015 to 2019. He also previously served in the Texas House of Representatives for the 66th district in southwestern Collin County. On March 2, 2022, Taylor admitted to an extramarital affair and announced that he would suspend his reelection campaign and retire at the end of the 117th Congress.

Early life, education, and career 
A seventh-generation Texan, Taylor was born in Dallas. He is a descendant of Humble Oil co-founder Robert Lee Blaffer. He grew up in Midland, Texas, where he attended the Hillander School and San Jacinto Junior High School. He graduated from St. Paul's School in Concord, New Hampshire. With numerous AP credits, he subsequently graduated in three years from Harvard College in Cambridge, Massachusetts, from which he obtained a Bachelor of Arts in history. He earned a Master of Business Administration from Harvard Business School in 2001.

From January 2002 to December 2018, Taylor worked for Churchill Capital Company, a real estate investment banking and principal investment firm, as a real estate investment banker. He previously worked for McKinsey & Company and Trammell Crow Company.

Taylor married Anne Coolidge, a real estate investment manager, in 2004.

Military service 
In Iraq, Taylor was assigned to the Marine Corps' Company C, 4th Reconnaissance Battalion and fought with 2nd Force Reconnaissance Company. As a captain, Taylor led missions in advance of Task Force Tarawa during Operation Iraqi Freedom, which detected and defeated several Fedayeen ambushes. He also participated in a casualty evacuation of 31 wounded Marines, transporting them safely to medical treatment.

Taylor's military decorations include the Navy Commendation Medal with "V", the Combat Action Ribbon, and the Presidential Unit Citation. Taylor left the Marine Corps Reserve as a major.

2006 campaign for U.S. House 

In 2005 and 2006, Taylor ran for Texas's 17th congressional district in the U.S. House of Representatives. He won the Republican primary with 54.03% of the vote. With 40.31% of the vote in the general election, he lost to incumbent Democrat Chet Edwards.

Texas House of Representatives

2010 campaign 
On December 2, 2009, Taylor announced his candidacy for the District 66 Texas State House seat. Plano city council member Mabrie Jackson had already resigned from the council to enter the House race. On November 30, 2009, incumbent representative Brian McCall announced that he would not run for reelection. Observers speculated that McCall had told Jackson that he would step down so that she could get a head start in the campaign. McCall also endorsed Jackson as his successor.

The candidates in the March 2 Republican primary were Wayne Richards, Jackson, and Taylor. While Jackson earned the largest number of votes (41%) in the primary, she was shy of the 50% plus one vote required to win the nomination outright. Richards promptly endorsed Taylor, who then defeated Jackson in the April run-off election. McCall left the House seat early, and Taylor was sworn into office on April 20, 2010, by Collin County Judge Keith Self.

Texas State Senate

2014 campaign 
On August 2, 2013, Taylor announced he would seek the Republican Party's 2014 nomination for the Texas Senate, District 8 seat held by Ken Paxton, who was stepping down to run for state attorney general.

Political positions 
Taylor is considered a major ally of the Tea Party movement. He was endorsed by the North Texas Tea Party for his 2014 campaign for Texas Senate, District 8.

In 2017, Taylor introduced legislation to establish a registry of individuals who have been barred from employment at an educational facility. The measure, if adopted, would prevent any school employee, not just administration and faculty, from working at a school if the person is found to have engaged in an improper relationship with a student.

Juneteenth
Taylor was one of two House Republicans to co-sponsor the Juneteenth National Independence Day Act.

Foreign policy
Taylor was among 129 Republicans to oppose President Donald Trump's withdrawal from Syria.

U.S. House of Representatives

Elections

2018 

In August 2017, Taylor announced his candidacy for the United States House of Representatives for Texas's 3rd congressional district. Incumbent 13-term Republican Sam Johnson had announced his retirement. Taylor was endorsed by the Club for Growth, a national conservative group, and With Honor, a cross-partisan political group supporting next-generation military veterans. Taylor secured the nomination after easily winning the March 6 primary. He won the November 6 general election with 54.3% of the vote.

Taylor's victory continued a run of Republican control in one of the first areas of Texas to turn Republican. The GOP has held the seat without interruption since a 1968 special election, and Taylor is only the fourth person to represent it since then. At the same time, it was the closest race in the district in over half a century; indeed, it was the first time since the regular 1968 election that a Democrat had crossed the 40% mark.

2020 

Taylor was unopposed in the 2020 Republican primary. In the general election, he faced Democrat Lulu Seikaly. Some observers considered him potentially vulnerable due to the district's demographic changes and its high population of college-educated voters, who had been trending away from the GOP in recent years. Taylor was reelected by over 12 percentage points even as President Donald Trump carried the district by only 1.

Tenure
On May 19, 2021, Taylor was one of 35 Republicans to join all Democrats in voting for legislation to establish the January 6 commission meant to investigate the storming of the U.S. Capitol. During his 2022 reelection campaign, this vote became a focal point for conservative critics and his opponents in the Republican primary, despite Taylor's conservative voting record on other issues.

2022 campaign and allegations of infidelity 
On February 27, 2022, two days before the Republican primary, right-wing media outlet National File posted an interview with Tania Joya, a British woman then living in Plano, who said that she and Taylor had a nine-month sexual affair in 2020 and 2021. Joya is the widow of John Georgelas, an American who gained notoriety for joining the Islamic State (commonly known as ISIS) in 2013, and has been dubbed the "ISIS bride" by the British tabloid press.

Saying that she and Taylor met during a "reprogramming" session for former jihadists, Joya shared salacious details about the affair and said that Taylor had given her $5,000 for her credit card bills and personal expenses. Her statements were repeated the next day by Breitbart News and circulated widely on social media. The Texas Tribune could not independently verify any of Joya's claims. In a statement to The Dallas Morning News, Joya said that she was "annoyed at having to see her ex-lover's face on billboards" and approached Taylor's Republican primary opponent Suzanne Harp, hoping that Harp would privately persuade Taylor to drop out of the race, but Taylor did not do so, prompting Joya to make her statements public.

On March 1, 2022, Taylor won 49% of the vote in the Republican primary, short of the 50% majority required to win outright, triggering a May 24 runoff election against runner-up and former Collin County judge Keith Self. The next day, in an email to supporters, Taylor announced the suspension of his reelection campaign: "About a year ago, I made a horrible mistake that has caused deep hurt and pain among those I love most in this world. I had an affair, it was wrong, and it was the greatest failure of my life. I want to apologize for the pain I have caused with my indiscretion, most of all to my wife Anne and our three daughters." Taylor did not indicate that he would resign from office before the end of his term but a campaign spokesperson said that he would withdraw from the election. Taylor formally withdrew from the runoff two days later, making Self the Republican nominee by default.

Committee assignment
Committee on Financial Services

Caucus memberships 

 For Country Caucus, Co-Chair
Problem Solvers Caucus
Republican Study Committee

Electoral history

References

External links 

|-

|-

|-

 

1972 births
21st-century American politicians
American Episcopalians
American investment bankers
Businesspeople from Texas
Harvard College alumni
Harvard Business School alumni
Living people
McKinsey & Company people
People from Dallas
People from Midland, Texas
People from Waco, Texas
Republican Party members of the Texas House of Representatives
Republican Party members of the United States House of Representatives from Texas
Republican Party Texas state senators
United States Marine Corps officers
United States Marine Corps personnel of the Iraq War
United States Marine Corps reservists